Human Rights Publishers is an international publishing group, founded in 2004 by three organizations: Human Rights Publishers, Prague; Izdatelstvo Prava Cheloveka, Moscow; and Izhevsk-based NGO «Redaktsiya zhurnala Pravozaschitnik» (Human Rights Defender journal).

Recent Publications
 Ivan Tolstoy. Doctor Zhivago: New Facts and Discoveries from the Nobel Archive (Prague: 2010)
 Vera Vasilyeva. No Witnesses? Nevzlin Case: Eyewitness Accounts of the Extramural Trial (Prague: 2009)
 Vera Vasilyeva. The Third Trial of Alexei Pichugin. "Yukos Case" Chronicles (Prague: 2007)
 Vera Vasilyeva. How Alexei Pichugin was judged: Court reportage (Prague: 2007)
 Andrey Shary. A Prayer for Serbia. The Secret of Zoran Djindjic’s Death (Prague: 2005)
 Andrey Shary. The Tribunal. Chronicles Of The Unfinished War (Moscow: 2003)

See also
 Human rights in Russia
 Moscow Helsinki Group
 International human rights instruments
 List of human rights organisations

External links
 Official website

Book publishing companies of Russia
Publishing companies established in 2004
Human rights in Russia